Dunkle Corners is an unincorporated community in Hamilton Township in McKean County, Pennsylvania, United States. Dunkle Corners is located along Pennsylvania Route 321, on the shore of the Allegheny Reservoir to the north of Kane.

References

Unincorporated communities in McKean County, Pennsylvania
Unincorporated communities in Pennsylvania